The 2013–14 Alabama–Huntsville Chargers ice hockey team represented the University of Alabama in Huntsville in the 2013–14 NCAA Division I men's ice hockey season. The Chargers were coached by Mike Corbett who was in his first season as head coach. His assistant coaches were Gavin Morgan and Matty Thomas. The Chargers played their home games in the Propst Arena at the Von Braun Center and competed for the first time in the Western Collegiate Hockey Association.

Preseason
On January 17, 2013, after months of discussions with conference officials and league member representatives, UAH formally applied to and was accepted to join the Western Collegiate Hockey Association beginning with the 2013–14 season, after three seasons as an independent.  On May 29, 2013, head coach Kurt Kleinendorst resigned, later signing as head coach of the American Hockey League's Iowa Wild.  Mike Corbett was named UAH's sixth head coach on July 8, 2013.  Matty Thomas was announced as assistant coach on August 8, replacing Bruce Garber.

Recruiting
UAH added 11 freshmen for the 2013–14 season, including 2 goaltenders, 7 forwards, and 2 defensemen:

Roster

Departures from 2012–13 team
Justin Cseter, F, Graduated – signed with the Huntsville Havoc (SPHL)
Curtis deBruyn, D, Graduated – signed with Miskolci JJSE (MOL Liga)
Sebastian Geoffrion, F, Graduated – signed with the Arizona Sundogs (CHL)
John Griggs, G, Graduated – signed with the Pensacola Ice Flyers (SPHL)
Gregg Gruehl, G
Tyler Kotlarz, F
Kyle Lysaght, F
Lasse Uusivirta, D – signed with the Aalborg Pirates (Denmark)

2013–14 team
As of October 13, 2013.

|}

Regular season

Schedule
  Green background indicates win.
  Red background indicates loss.
  Yellow background indicates tie.

Standings

Player stats
As of January 18, 2014

Skaters

Goaltenders

References

External links
 UAH Chargers Hockey website

Alabama–Huntsville Chargers men's ice hockey seasons
Alabama-Huntsville
Alabama-Huntsville Chargers men's ice hockey
Alabama-Huntsville Chargers men's ice hockey